Boy Woodburn is a 1922 British silent sports film directed by Guy Newall and starring Newall, Ivy Duke and Mary Rorke. It is set in the world of English horse racing. It was known in the United States by the alternative title Wings of the Turf. It was based on the 1917 novel Boy Woodburn by Alfred Ollivant.

Cast
 Guy Newall as Jim Silver 
 Ivy Duke as Boy Woodburn 
 Mary Rorke as Ma Woodburn 
 A. Bromley Davenport as Matt Woodburn 
 Cameron Carr as Jaggers 
 John Alexander as Monkey Brand

References

Bibliography
 Bamford, Kentom. Distorted Images: British National Identity and Film in the 1920s. I.B. Tauris, 1999.
 Low, Rachael. History of the British Film, 1918-1929. George Allen & Unwin, 1971.

External links

1922 films
1920s sports films
British horse racing films
British black-and-white films
British silent feature films
Films directed by Guy Newall
Films set in England
Films set in Sussex
Films based on British novels
1920s English-language films
1920s British films
Silent sports films